The Lady and the Dale is an American documentary television miniseries revolving around Elizabeth Carmichael, who launched Twentieth Century Motor Car Corporation and created a car called "The Dale". It consists of four episodes and premiered on HBO on January 31, 2021.

Synopsis
In 1970, entrepreneur Elizabeth Carmichael rose to fame with her creation: "The Dale", a fuel efficient three-wheeled car. As the car rose to prominence, it thrust Carmichael into media scrutiny about the car's technology and her own past.

The series features interviews with Carmichael's children Candi Michael and Michael Michael; grandchild Jeri Buchard; news anchors and journalists Dick Carlson, Pete Noyes and Mark Lisheron; Carmichael's brother-in-law Charles Richard Barrett; former employees of Twentieth Century Motor Car Corporation; and Susan Stryker, Mia Yamamoto and Sandy Stone.

Episodes

Production
In August 2020, it was announced that Nick Cammilleri and Zackary Drucker would direct the series and executive produce, with Mark Duplass and Jay Duplass serving as executive producers under their Duplass Brothers Productions banner, with HBO Documentary Films producing and HBO set to distribute.

Reception
On Rotten Tomatoes, the series holds an approval rating of 100% based on 19 reviews, with an average rating of 8.12/10. The website's critical consensus states, "An intoxicating blend of historical footage, candid interviews, and animation that deftly captures Liz Carmichael's incredible life, The Lady and the Dale is a wild ride." On Metacritic, the series has a weighted average score of 76 out of 100, based on 11 critics, indicating "generally favorable reviews".

Writing for The Wall Street Journal media critic John Anderson described the series as "A lot of stories - about fraud, flight, FBI manhunts, transgender politics, selective prosecution, bias in the media, and corruption in the courts." Anderson faulted the series for its extensive use of cutout animation, an approach described as "too flippant for the subject matter."

Accolades

References

External links
 

2021 American television series debuts
2021 American television series endings
2020s American documentary television series
2020s American television miniseries
English-language television shows
HBO original programming
HBO documentary films
True crime television series
Television series set in the 1970s
Television series by Home Box Office
Television series by Duplass Brothers Productions
Documentary television series about crime in the United States
2020s American LGBT-related television series
Transgender-related television shows